Nicole Sciberras (born 28 April 2001) is a Maltese footballer who plays as a defender for Maltese club Hibernians and the Malta national team.

International career
Sciberras has been capped for the Malta national team, appearing for the team during the UEFA Women's Euro 2021 qualifying cycle.

Honours
 Serie A: 2020–21

References

External links
 
 

2001 births
Living people
Maltese women's footballers
Women's association football defenders
Maltese expatriate footballers
Maltese expatriate sportspeople in Italy
Expatriate women's footballers in Italy
Serie A (women's football) players
Juventus F.C. (women) players
Malta women's youth international footballers
Malta women's international footballers